Cedarville is a village in Greene County, Ohio, United States. The village is within the Dayton Metropolitan Statistical Area. The population was 4,019 at the 2010 census.

History
Cedarville was originally known as Milford, and under the latter name was platted in 1816. A post office called Massies Creek was established in 1837, and the name was changed to Cedarville in 1843. The present name is for cedar trees near the original town site.

For many years beginning in the 1880s, public life in Cedarville centered around the downtown Cedarville Opera House; it survives to the present day, and is listed on the National Register of Historic Places.

Geography
Cedarville is located at  (39.742796, -83.807084).

Demographics

2010 census
As of the census of 2010, there were 4,019 people, 686 households, and 411 families living in the village. The racial makeup of the village was 94.4% White, 2.3% African American, 0.1% Native American, 1.1% Asian, 0.3% from other races, and 1.7% from two or more races. Hispanic or Latino of any race were 2.2% of the population.

There were 686 households, of which 26.5% had children under the age of 18 living with them, 47.7% were married couples living together, 9.3% had a female householder with no husband present, 2.9% had a male householder with no wife present, and 40.1% were non-families. 28.4% of all households were made up of individuals, and 12.3% had someone living alone who was 65 years of age or older. The average household size was 2.45 and the average family size was 2.96.

The median age in the village was 21 years. 9.2% of residents were under the age of 18; 66.4% were between the ages of 18 and 24; 8.4% were from 25 to 44; 9.8% were from 45 to 64; and 6% were 65 years of age or older. The gender makeup of the village was 46.5% male and 53.5% female.

2000 census
As of the census of 2000, there were 3,828 people, 681 households, and 420 families living in the village. The population density was 3,594.6 people per square mile (1,394.3/km). There were 722 housing units at an average density of 678.0 per square mile (263.0/km). The racial makeup of the village was 95.06% White, 1.99% African American, 0.39% Native American, 0.81% Asian, 0.03% Pacific Islander, 0.31% from other races, and 1.41% from two or more races. Hispanic or Latino of any race were 0.94% of the population.

There were 681 households, out of which 28.8% had children under the age of 18 living with them, 51.2% were married couples living together, 7.6% had a female householder with no husband present, and 38.2% were non-families. 26.1% of all households were made up of individuals, and 9.1% had someone living alone who was 65 years of age or older. The average household size was 2.55 and the average family size was 3.08.

In the village, the population was spread out, with 10.4% under the age of 18, 65.0% from 18 to 24, 10.7% from 25 to 44, 8.4% from 45 to 64, and 5.5% who were 65 years of age or older. The median age was 21 years. For every 100 females there were 85.9 males. For every 100 females age 18 and over, there were 83.8 males.

The median income for a household in the village was $37,200, and the median income for a family was $44,234. Males had a median income of $32,500 versus $22,813 for females. The per capita income for the village was $9,499. About 5.4% of families and 13.8% of the population were below the poverty line, including 5.6% of those under age 18 and 4.3% of those age 65 or over.

Education

The Cedar Cliff Local School District operates three public schools combined in one building in the village: Cedarville Elementary School, Cedarville Middle School, and Cedarville High School. The Cedar Cliff Local School District gets its name from the two towns which it serves, Cedarville and Clifton.

Cedarville University, a Baptist institution, has been in operation at Cedarville since 1887.

Cedarville has a public library, a branch of the Greene County Public Library.

Arts and culture

CedarFest
To celebrate its distinction as the birthplace of James H. Kyle, Cedarville commemorates Labor Day with CedarFest, an annual festival including a parade, a performance by the Cedarville High School Marching Band, pancake breakfast at the fire station, carnival games and rides, a community church service, and exhibitions of local cuisine. The weekend is capped by a fireworks display on the Sunday before Labor Day in Cedar Park.

Little Town of Lights
The Little Town of Lights is held annually on the first weekend of December. Residents coordinate their outdoor lighted decorations (traditionally empty gallon milk jugs with a candle placed inside) and also compete for the best display. There are also hay rides, photo opportunities with Santa Claus, outdoor caroling and samples of local cuisine. There is a live Nativity scene complete with live animals located outside of Grace Baptist Church, where they also offer homemade cookies.

Notable people
 David Jeremiah, evangelist
 Bumpus Jones, Major League Baseball player
 Mike Kellogg, radio evangelist
 James H. Kyle, politician, South Dakota senator, "Father" of Labor Day
 Eleanor Parker, actress
 Whitelaw Reid, newspaper publisher and statesman

References

External links
 Village of Cedarville
 Cedarville Chamber of Commerce
 Cedarville branch of the Greene Country Public Library
 Cedarville University

Villages in Greene County, Ohio
Villages in Ohio
Populated places established in 1816
1816 establishments in Ohio